Sujith Shanker is an Indian actor, known for his works in theater and Malayalam cinema. He trained under Kavalam Narayana Panicker at the Sopanam Institute of Performing Arts (1999–2002) and subsequently at the National School of Drama (2002–2005) in New Delhi. Here, he worked with and studied under the likes of Anuradha Kapur, Abhilash Pillai, Khaled Tyabji, Robin Das, Kirti Jain, M. K. Raina, C. R. Jambe, Anamika Haksar and Adil Hussain.

HELEN, written and performed by Sujith Shanker and directed by Abhilash Pillai was performed at Tokyo and Seoul as part of Performing Women: 3 Reinterpretations from Greek Tragedy hosted by the Japan Foundation as part of a joint work with artists from India, Iran, Uzbekistan, and Japan, in 2007 and 2009

Career
He was noticed in Rajeev Ravi's Malayalam film Njan Steve Lopez  and is notable for his villainous roles in Malayalam cinema. He got his breakthrough with Dileesh Pothan's Maheshinte Prathikaaram.  He also performed at the UNESCO International Theater Festival in Peru in 2010.

Personal life

Sujith is the grandson of E. M. S. Namboodiripad. His mother, Dr. M. P. Yamuna, was a gynecologist and his father E. M. Sreedharan was a chartered accountant and politician. His brother, Ameet Parameswaran, is Asst. Professor, Dept. of Arts and Aesthetics at Jawaharlal Nehru University. He is married to Anju Mohandas, a filmmaker.

Filmography 

All films are in Malayalam language unless otherwise noted.

References

External links 
 

Male actors from Kerala
Year of birth missing (living people)
Living people
21st-century Indian male actors
Male actors in Malayalam cinema
Indian male film actors
Place of birth missing (living people)